Mohamed Kamal Ismail (محمد كمال اسماعيل) (born; 13 September 1908 - 2 August 2008) was an Egyptian architect.

Career
His most prominent work is the expansion of the Great Mosque of Mecca and Al-Masjid an-Nabawi, as well as The Mogamma and  High Court of Egypt.

References

1908 births
2008 deaths
Egyptian architects